Notoscopelus elongatus is a species of lanternfish in the family Myctophidae. It is endemic to the Mediterranean Sea where it is found in deep water habitats, rising to near the surface to feed at night and descending to great depths by day. It is a common species with no particular threats, and the International Union for Conservation of Nature has listed its conservation status as being of least concern.

Description
The number of soft rays in the dorsal fin is 21 to 23, in the anal fin 18 to 19, and in the pectoral fins, 12 to 13. There is a distinctive arrangement of photophores (light-emitting organs) on the head and body. It is very similar in morphology to Notoscopelus kroyeri but differs in having 23 to 25 gill rakers whereas N. kroyeri has 26 to 29.

Distribution
N. elongatus is endemic to the Mediterranean Sea where it is found in greatest abundance in the Western Basin and the Ligurian Sea and Tyrrhenian Sea. The purpose of the daily migration is probably to feed at night in the plankton-rich surface waters but avoid predators during the day in the ocean depths. If the fish takes six to twelve hours to digest its food, this cycle of activity serves to transfer nutrients from surface waters to much greater depths.

References

Myctophidae
Fish described in 1844
Fish of the Mediterranean Sea
Taxa named by Oronzio Gabriele Costa